Mably is a commune in the Loire department in central France.

Population

International relations

Mably is twinned with:
  Wantage, England
  Wannweil, Germany
  Piatra Neamţ, Romania

See also
Communes of the Loire department

References

Communes of Loire (department)